Germana Paolieri (29 August 1906 – 8 August 1998) was an Italian actress. During the 1930s she became a leading lady of Italian cinema appearing in major films such as the 1938 biopic Giuseppe Verdi.

Selected filmography
 The Opera Singer (1932)
 The Gift of the Morning (1932)
 La Wally (1932)
 My Little One (1933)
 Lorenzino de' Medici (1935)
 Luciano Serra, Pilot (1938)
 Star of the Sea (1938)
 All of Life in One Night (1938)
 Giuseppe Verdi (1938)
 Madame Butterfly (1939)
 Kean (1940)
 Saint Maria (1942)
 The Two Orphans (1942)
 Resurrection (1944)
 The Ten Commandments (1945)
 Hand of Death (1949)
 Cavalcade of Heroes (1950)
 Naples Sings (1953)
 It Happened in the Park (1953)
 The Island Monster (1954)
 It Takes Two to Sin in Love (1954)
 The Two Friends (1955)
 The Song of the Heart (1955)
 The Angel of the Alps (1957)

Bibliography
 Landy, Marcia. The Folklore of Consensus: Theatricality in the Italian Cinema, 1930-1943. SUNY Press, 1998.

External links

1906 births
1998 deaths
Italian television actresses
Italian film actresses
Actors from Florence
20th-century Italian actresses